Rome2rio is an Australian online multimodal transport journey planner offering traveling services globally. The company is based in Melbourne, Australia. It is owned by the German online travel comparison and booking website Omio.

History
Rome2rio was founded by Bernhard Tschirren and Dr. Michael Cameron, two ex-Microsoft software engineers. The site was born out of their frustrations with the lack of a fast, easy-to-use, and comprehensive multi-modal search engine with global coverage.

The two co-founders began work on the product in September 2010 and won the Melbourne Azure Bizspark Camp Award in February 2011.

The beta version of Rome2rio was launched on 7 April 2011.

Rod Cuthbert, the founder of Viator, became CEO in May 2012 as the company raised $450,000.

Rome2rio won the People's Choice Award at Phocuswright 2012, the TRAVELtech Global Collect Website of the Year in 2013, the Data Specialist Award at the 2015 WITovation Awards and the Best Metasearch Award at the 2016 Travolution Awards.

The company raised $2.8 million in funding including a 2014 grant of $1.2 million from Commercialization Australia.

In July 2015, it announced that support for its white label product would cease in January 2016, citing pressure on development resources brought on by rapid growth in its consumer business. The company initially offered both white-label products and application programming interface options for partners wishing to integrate its multi-modal results into websites and mobile apps.

In 2016, the company added direct booking options.

In April 2017, Rod Cuthbert became Executive Chairman, Michael Cameron became CEO and Bernie Tschirren was made Chief Architect. Kirsteene Phelan became COO.

In November 2017, Rome2rio moved to a new headquarters in Richmond, Melbourne's digital quarter.

In July 2019, Craig Penfold joins the company as Chief Technology Officer.

In October 2019, Rome2rio was acquired by Omio, the Berlin-based travel booking platform.

In January 2020, Yeswanth Munnangi (Yesh) took over as CEO of Rome2rio, and Michael Cameron joined the board of directors.

References

2019 mergers and acquisitions
Australian travel websites
Cartography
Companies based in Melbourne
Intermodal transport
Internet properties established in 2011
2011 establishments in Australia
Internet search engines
Public transport information systems
Route planning websites
Travel ticket search engines
International multimodal travel search engines